Lucas Pellas (born 28 August 1995) is a Swedish handball player for Montpellier Handball and the Swedish national team.

He participated at the 2020 European Championship in Sweden, the 2021 World Championship, the 2020 Summer Olympics, the 2022 European Championship, and the 2023 World Championship.

Individual awards 
 Best Left wing of Handbollsligan: 2018/19
 Best Left wing of Handbollsligan: 2019/20
 "Årets Komet" 2020

References

External links
 Lucas Pellas at European Handball Federation
 Lucas Pellas at Ligue nationale de handball
 Lucas pellas at Olympedia

1995 births
Living people
Handball players from Stockholm
Swedish male handball players
Lugi HF players
Montpellier Handball players
Hammarby IF Handboll players
Expatriate handball players
Swedish expatriate sportspeople in France
Handball players at the 2020 Summer Olympics
Olympic handball players of Sweden
21st-century Swedish people